The 2017 FIBA Under-16 Women's Americas Championship was an international basketball competition that was held in Buenos Aires, Argentina from 7–11 June 2017.

The  defeated the defending champions , 91–46, in the final game to reclaim the championship. Meanwhile, the hosts  edged first-time semifinalists  in the bronze medal game, 59–52, in overtime. The top four teams qualified to the 2018 FIBA Under-17 Women’s Basketball World Cup.

Venue

Qualified teams

Group phase
A draw was held on 23 May 2017 in San Juan, Puerto Rico.

All times are local (UTC–3).

Group A

Group B

Preliminary Round 
In the first preliminary round game, Colombia faced the US. Aliya Boston was the leading scorer for the US team with 17 points, while Samantha Brunelle scored 13. Caitlin Clark took three shots from beyond the three point arc and hit all three of them. Kylie Watson and Paige Bueckers were also double-digit scorers with 10 points each. The US won by a score of 91–33.

The US next faced Mexico. The opening quarter was close with the US leading by a single point at the end of the quarter. A full court press in the second quarter helped the United States pull away from Mexico en route to a 100–37 win. Brunelle had a double double with 18 points and 11 rebounds. Bueckers took seven shots and hit all seven to set a US single-game record for field-goal percentage.

The final preliminary game for the US was against Puerto Rico. The US did not shoot well from the field, hitting only 31% of the shots. They had difficulty controlling the ball, turning it over 27 times, but their aggressive play forced 43 turnovers against Puerto Rico which included a US U16 record of 25 steals in a single game. The leading scorer was Boston who recorded 17 points and tied a record for free throw percentage hitting all five of her free-throw attempts. The US won the game 79–32.

Classification round
All times are local (UTC-3).

Classification 5–8

Seventh place game

Fifth place game

Final round
All times are local (UTC-3).

Semifinals

Third place game

US - Argentina 
The United States played Argentina in the semifinal game. The US had a 13-point lead at halftime, 40–27, but partway through the third period, started to run that would put the game away. They scored 39 consecutive points which extended from roughly the middle of the third period until the middle of the fourth. they had set an all-time record for steals in a game against Puerto Rico but they increase their own record by two with 27 steals in the game. They also set our record for free throws attempted with 37 every one of the US players scored. The final score in favor of the US was 98–42.

Final

US - Canada 
In the gold-medal game, the United States faced Canada. This game also featured a long scoring run, with the United States outscoring Canada 20–0 to close the first half. Aggressive defense held Canada to 29% field goal shooting for the game. Azzi Fudd, the only 14-year-old on a team of 15 and 16-year-olds, scored 18 points to lead the US team to a 91–46 win and the gold medal.

Awards

Final ranking

References

External links
 Official website

FIBA Americas Under-16 Championship for Women
2017 in women's basketball
2016–17 in North American basketball
2016–17 in South American basketball
2016–17 in Argentine basketball
International women's basketball competitions hosted by Argentina
Youth sport in Argentina
2017  
June 2017 sports events in South America